Sara Coburn (born 25 December 1962 in Northern Ireland) is a journalist, and a business presenter on BBC Breakfast and the BBC News channel.

Career 
Coburn joined the BBC in 1985. Her first role was as a reporter with BBC Radio 4's The World At One and PM programmes. She began to specialise in business journalism in 1987 when she joined Channel 4's Business Daily as a producer, but returned to the BBC in 1989 to present BBC1's flagship Business Breakfast alongside Paul Burden. She co-presented with Burden for a number of years, working on both domestic and international business stories.

Coburn later became a business news presenter on BBC Breakfast and the BBC News channel, where she interviews company bosses, politicians and commentators about business-related subjects, such as corporate news, stock markets and personal finance.

External links 
 Sara Coburn at bbc.co.uk
 

BBC newsreaders and journalists
Living people
British business and financial journalists
Journalists from Northern Ireland
1963 births